This is a list of women artists who were born in Iran or whose artworks are closely associated with that country.

A
Panteha Abareshi (born 1999), multidisciplinary artist based in Los Angeles, California
Golnar Adili (born 1976), artist based in Brooklyn, New York
Shahla Aghapour, painter, sculptor, performance art, author, gallery director
Shiva Ahmadi (born 1975), painter, video artist, and installation artist, based in the San Francisco Bay Area
Shirin Aliabadi (1973–2018), visual artist, previously based in Tehran
Samira Alikhanzadeh (born 1967), painter
Morehshin Allahyari (born 1985), artist active since 2007, educator, based in Brooklyn
Afruz Amighi (born 1974), sculptor, installation art, based in Brooklyn
Nazgol Ansarinia (born 1979), painter
Shahla Arbabi (born 1945), mixed media artist, based in Washington D.C.
Akram Monfared Arya (born 1946), painter late in life, but best known as the second licensed female aircraft pilot of Iran

B
Nairy Baghramian (born 1971), sculpture and mixed media artist, based in Berlin
Sonia Balassanian (born 1942), Armenian-Iranian painter, sculptor, installation artist, and curator; based in New York City and Yerevan
Fatemeh Behboudi (born 1985), photographer, photojournalist

C 

 Shaghayegh Cyrous (born 1987), interdisciplinary, activist, and social practice artist, based in San Francisco

D
Parisa Damandan (born 1967), photographer, art historian
Iran Darroudi (born 1936–2021), contemporary artist
Solmaz Daryani (born 1989), photographer
Gohar Dashti (born 1980), photographer, video artist

E
Maryam Eisler, Iranian-born, London-based photographer, editor, and author
Fatemeh Emdadian (born 1955), sculptor

F
Atena Farghadani (born 1987), cartoonist, political activist
Homa Vafaie Farley, Iranian-born potter and ceramist
Tannaz Farsi (born 1974), sculptor and multidisciplinary artist, based in Eugene, Oregon
Golnaz Fathi (born 1972), contemporary artist
Bita Fayyazi (born 1962), sculptor and ceramist known for Iranian public art projects
Chohreh Feyzdjou (1955–1996), sculpture, installation art
Parastou Forouhar (born 1962), installation artist based in Germany
Soraya French (born 1957), painter, writer

G
Pariyoush Ganji (born 1945), painter based in Tehran
Mokarrameh Ghanbari (1928–2005), painter
Shadi Ghadirian (born 1974), photographer, based in Tehran
Bita Ghezelayagh (born 1966), sculptor based in Tehran and London
Hengameh Golestan (born 1952), photographer

H
Nahid Hagigat (born 1943), illustrator, printmaker and painter in New York
Fariba Hajamadi (born 1957), visual artist based in New York City.
Gita Hashemi (born 1961), transdisciplinary artist based in Toronto, Canada
Maryam Hashemi (born 1977), visual artist based in London
Taraneh Hemami (born 1960), visual artist based in the San Francisco Bay Area
Sooreh Hera (born 1973), photographer, artist, born in Tehran
Mansooreh Hosseini (1926–2012), contemporary artist
Shirazeh Houshiary (born 1955), installation artist, sculptor
Sheree Hovsepian (born 1974), collage artist and photographer, based in New York City.

J
Rana Javadi (born 1953), photographer in Tehran.
Pouran Jinchi (born 1959), calligrapher, painter, sculptor, active in New York since 1990s

K
Shokufeh Kavani (born 1970), contemporary painter based in Sydney
Zhaleh Kazemi (1944–2003), painter
Amineh Kazemzadeh (born 1963), painter
Simin Keramati (born 1970), Iranian-born Canadian multidisciplinary visual artist and activist
Sanam Khatibi (born 1979), contemporary artist based in Belgium
Laleh Khorramian (born 1974), Iranian-American multidisciplinary visual artist
Arghavan Khosravi (born 1984), Iranian-born American painter and sculptor

L 

 Farideh Lashai (1944–2013), abstract painter, writer, and translator

M
Tala Madani (born 1981), Iranian-born American painter
Nadia Maftouni (born 1966), painter, academic researcher, Islamic theologist, philosopher, and author
Saba Masoumian (born 1982), contemporary artist
Leyly Matine-Daftary (1937–2007), modernist artist, educator
Sanaz Mazinani (born 1978), Iranian-Canadian multidisciplinary artist, works including installation art, photography
Laleh Mehran, Iranian-American multimedia artist and professor
Alina Mnatsakanian (born 1958), Iranian-Armenian Switzerland-based visual artist
Mandana Moghaddam (born 1962), Iranian-Swedish visual artist
Neda Moridpour, Iranian-American artist, educator, active since 2012
Noreen Motamed (born 1967), painter
Nurieh Mozaffari (born 1960), Iranian-Canadian contemporary painter

N
Malekeh Nayiny (born 1955), artist based in Paris
Shirin Neshat (born 1957), visual artist based in New York
Mina Nouri (born 1951), painter
Guity Novin (born 1944), Iranian-Canadian figurative painter, graphic designer

O 

 Farah Ossouli (born 1953), painter based in Iran

R
Sara Rahbar (born 1976), contemporary mixed-media artist, based in New York
Pantea Rahmani (born 1971), contemporary artist
Raha Raissnia (born 1968), contemporary artist
Shokouh Riazi (1921–1965), modernist painter

S
Behjat Sadr (1924–2009), impressionistic painter
Maryam Salour (born 1954), sculptor, ceramist, painter
Ashraf os-Saltaneh (1863–1914), princess, photographer of the Qajar period, and one of the earliest women photographers and journalists
Zohreh Etezad Saltaneh (born 1962), painter, weaver, calligrapher, who works with her feet
Golnar Servatian (born 1977), cartoonist, illustrator
Massoumeh Seyhoun (1934–2010), painter, gallerist, curator
Hadieh Shafie (born 1969), painter, based in the United States
Shirana Shahbazi (born 1974), photographer, installation artist, based in Switzerland
Naz Shahrokh (born 1969), miniature painting, sculptures, installation art, land art, and video art
Monir Shahroudy Farmanfarmaian (1922–2019), best known for her mirror mosaics, sculptor, painter, textile designer
Sara Shamsavari (born 1979), British-Iranian multidisciplinary artist
Mojgan Shajarian (born 1970), Iranian painter, designer, musician
Soheila_Sokhanvari (born 1964), Iranian painter and multi-media artist, based in Cambridge, UK
Sheida Soleimani (born 1990), Iranian-American multidisciplinary artist, based in Rhode Island

T
Taravat Talepasand (born 1979), Iranian-American painter and sculptor, based in Oregon.
Newsha Tavakolian (born 1981), photographer, photojournalist

Z
Maryam Zandi (born 1946), photographer
Niloofar Ziae (born 1962), painter, educator
Minoosh Zomorodinia, Iranian-born American visual artist, curator, and educator in San Francisco

See also
 List of Iranian artists
 List of Iranian painters
 Iranian modern and contemporary art

References 

-
Iranian women artists, List of
Artists, List of Iranian
Artists

